Sugarloaf Mountain, of Arizona is the tallest peak in the arid, low elevation Hummingbird Springs Wilderness of northwest Maricopa County, and about  west of Phoenix. Hummingbird Springs Wilderness is just north of the Big Horn Mountains Wilderness. The two are separated only by a jeep trail that leads to Hummingbird Springs.

The areas washes drain the into southwest-flowing Tiger Wash at the southeast of the Harquahala Mountains. Tiger Wash is a tributary wash in the central-upper regions of the southeast flowing Centennial Wash, a tributary to the Gila River.

References

External links 
 "Arizona Wilderness Areas – Public Lands – Recreation Sites". Arizona Outback Online.

Landforms of Maricopa County, Arizona
Mountains of Arizona
Mountains of Maricopa County, Arizona